Carmen Alborch Bataller (31 October 1947 – 24 October 2018) was a Spanish politician, writer, and minister of culture.

Biography and career
Alborch gained a doctorate in law with particular specialty in mercantile law. She directed the Valencia Institute of Modern Art (IVAM) between 1988 and 1993. She became politically active with the Spanish Socialist Workers' Party (PSOE) in 1992 and served as Minister of Culture from 1993 to 1996 in the last government of Felipe González. She was the recipient of the Gran Cruz de Carlos III and the Gran Cruz del Mérito Civil, and the Progressive Women's Award.

In 1996, Alborch was elected to the Congress of Deputies, representing Valencia. She chaired  the Committee of Control of RTVE (the state radio and TV corporation) from 1996 until January 2000, and the Commission on Women's Rights and Equal Opportunities from May 2004 to January 2008 in the Congress. She authored books including Solas (Women Alone) and Malas (Bad Women).

In addition to numerous television appearances as a politician, Alborch also played minor roles in the Spanish television series El círculo a primera hora, El primer café, and Los desayunos de TVE.

In May 2007, she stood as the PSOE candidate for Mayor of Valencia but lost to the incumbent People's Party Mayor Rita Barberá. She retired from the lower chamber at the 2008 general election in order to be elected to the Spanish Senate, once again representing Valencia until 2016.

Alborch died on 24 October 2018 from cancer, aged 70.

References

External links

 

1947 births
2018 deaths
Culture ministers of Spain
Deaths from cancer in Spain
Members of the 6th Congress of Deputies (Spain)
Members of the 7th Congress of Deputies (Spain)
Members of the 8th Congress of Deputies (Spain)
Members of the Senate of Spain
People from Vall d'Albaida
Spanish feminists
Spanish Socialist Workers' Party politicians
21st-century Spanish writers
University of Valencia alumni
Politicians from the Valencian Community
Women government ministers of Spain
20th-century Spanish women politicians
21st-century Spanish women politicians